11th CFCA Awards
March 1, 1999

Best Film: 
 Saving Private Ryan 
The 11th Chicago Film Critics Association Awards, given on 1 March 1999, honored the finest achievements in 1998 filmmaking.

Winners
Best Actor:
Ian McKellen - Gods and Monsters
Best Actress: 
Cate Blanchett - Elizabeth
Best Cinematography: 
The Thin Red Line - John Toll
Best Director: 
Terrence Malick - The Thin Red Line
Best Film: 
Saving Private Ryan
Best Foreign Language Film: 
La vita è bella (Life Is Beautiful), Italy
Best Score: 
"The Truman Show" - Burkhard Dallwitz
Best Screenplay: 
Shakespeare in Love - Marc Norman and Tom Stoppard
Best Supporting Actor: 
Billy Bob Thornton - A Simple Plan
Best Supporting Actress: 
Kathy Bates - Primary Colors
Most Promising Actor: 
Joseph Fiennes - Shakespeare in Love
Most Promising Actress: 
Kimberly Elise - Beloved

References
https://web.archive.org/web/20120515203059/http://www.chicagofilmcritics.org/index.php?option=com_content&view=article&id=48&Itemid=58

 1998
1998 film awards